Peggy Sutherlin née Berry (born 1937) is an American bridge player from Dallas, Texas.

Sutherlin earned a B.A. from San Francisco State University and worked as an airline flight attendant. "When I applied for the job, I told them I wanted to be a stewardess so I could go to bridge tournaments. The plan worked! I was a stewardess for 37 years." She has been a member of several contract bridge governing committees and the ACBL Board of Governors.

Sutherlin was Inducted into the ACBL Hall of Fame in 2014 as a recipient of the Blackwood Award for contributions to the game "without necessarily being world class player".

Bridge accomplishments

Awards and honors

 ACBL Hall of Fame, Blackwood Award 2014

Wins

 World Team Olympiad Women's Teams (1) 2000 

 North American Bridge Championships (9)
 Rockwell Mixed Pairs (1) 1972 
 Grand National Teams (1) 2006 
 Machlin Women's Swiss Teams (2) 1999, 2004 
 Wagar Women's Knockout Teams (2) 1986, 2004 
 Sternberg Women's Board-a-Match Teams (2) 1998, 2000 
 Chicago Mixed Board-a-Match (1) 1976

Runners-up

 World Mixed Pairs (1) 1982
 North American Bridge Championships
 Whitehead Women's Pairs (1) 1986 
 Smith Life Master Women's Pairs (1) 2011 
 Machlin Women's Swiss Teams (2) 2002, 2005 
 Wagar Women's Knockout Teams (3) 2000, 2006, 2009 
 Sternberg Women's Board-a-Match Teams (1) 2004

References

External links
 
 

1937 births
American contract bridge players
People from Dallas
San Francisco State University alumni
Living people
Place of birth missing (living people)
Date of birth missing (living people)